Taju-ye Vosta (also Romanized as Tājū-ye Vosţá; also known as Tājū-ye ‘Olyā and Tājū) is a village in Zagheh Rural District, Zagheh District, Khorramabad County, Lorestan Province, Iran. At the 2006 census, its population was 16, in 4 families.

References 

Towns and villages in Khorramabad County